The women's wakeboard freestyle competition in water skiing at the 2009 World Games took place from 22 to 25 July at the Lotus Pond in Kaohsiung, Taiwan.

Competition format
A total of 10 athletes entered the competition. In preliminary two best athletes qualifies to the final. Athletes who can't qualify through this stage takes last chance qualifiers, from which the best two athletes qualifies to the final.

Results

Preliminary

Heat 1

Heat 2

Last Chance Qualifiers

Final

References

External links 
 Results

Water skiing at the 2009 World Games